Woolfson v Strathclyde Regional Council [1978] UKHL 5 is a UK company law case concerning piercing the corporate veil.

Facts
A bridal clothing shop at 53-61 St George's Road was compulsorily purchased by the Glasgow Corporation. The business in the shop was run by a company called Campbell Ltd. But the shop itself, though all on one floor, was composed of different units of property. Mr Solomon Woolfson owned three units and another company, Solfred Holdings Ltd owned the other two. Mr Woolfson had 999 shares in Campbell Ltd and his wife the other. They had twenty and ten shares respectively in Solfred Ltd. Mr Woolfson and Solfred Ltd claimed compensation together for loss of business after the compulsory purchase, arguing that this situation was analogous to the case of DHN v Tower Hamlets LBC.

The Land Tribunal denied it on the basis that Campbell Ltd was the sole occupier.

Judgment
Lord Keith upheld the decision of the Scottish Court of Appeal, refusing to follow and doubting DHN v Tower Hamlets BC. He said that DHN was easily distinguishable because Mr Woolfson did not own all the shares in Solfred, as Bronze was wholly owned by DHN, and Campbell had no control at all over the owners of the land. The one situation where the veil could be lifted was whether there are special circumstances indicating that the company is a ‘mere façade concealing the true facts’. Lord Keith's judgment dealt with DHN as follows.

Lords Wilberforce, Fraser and Russell and Dundy concurred.

See also

UK company law
The Albazero [1977] AC 774, 807, Roskill LJ, ‘the rights of one company in a group cannot be exercised by another company in that group even though the ultimate benefit of the exercise of those rights would ensure beneficially to the same person or corporate body.’
Bank of Tokyo Ltd v Karoon [1987] AC 45n, 64, Robert Goff LJ, ‘Counsel suggested beguilingly that it would be technical for us to distinguish between parent company and subsidiary in this context; economically, he said, they were one. But we are concerned not with economics but with law. The distinction between the two is, in law, fundamental and cannot here be abridged.’
Canada Safeway Ltd v Local 373, Canadian Food and Allied Workers (1974) 46 DLR (3d) 113, that there is no secondary action against an associated company. This was not followed in Dimbleby & Sons Ltd v National Union of Journalists [1984] 1 All ER 751
Adams v Cape Industries plc [1990] Ch 433

Notes

References

United Kingdom company case law
United Kingdom corporate personality case law
House of Lords cases
1978 in case law
1978 in British law